The Law of the Lawless is a lost 1923 American silent drama film directed by Victor Fleming.

Cast
Dorothy Dalton as Sahande
Charles de Rochefort as Costa (credited as Charles De Roche)
Theodore Kosloff as Sender
Tully Marshall as Ali Mechmet
Fred Huntley as Osman
Margaret Loomis as Fanutza
Frank Coghlan, Jr.
The German Shepherd "Beneva", later "Thunder the Dog" (uncredited)

References

External links

Lobby poster

1923 films
American black-and-white films
Silent American drama films
American silent feature films
1923 drama films
Films directed by Victor Fleming
Lost American films
1923 lost films
Lost drama films
1920s American films